Thornton Heath is a district of South London, England, within the London Borough of Croydon. Prior to the creation of Greater London in 1965, Thornton Heath was in the County Borough of Croydon.

History

Until the arrival of the railway in 1862, Thornton Heath was focused on an area  in the parish of Croydon St John the Baptist, south west of the Whitehorse manor house (now a school), at the locality on the main London–Sussex road known as Thornton Heath Pond. Between the manor house and pond was an isolated farmhouse. Eventually it became the site for the railway station and the main expansion hub.

In the 50-year period from 1861 to 1911, Thornton Heath saw a complete transformation from isolated rural outpost to integrated metropolitan suburb. In its infancy, a new railway station in the eastern farmlands enabled the immediate area to evolve around a central point. In the late 19th century, the western part of Thornton Heath, which lay directly on the main London–Sussex road, demonstrated a classic form of suburban ribbon development. In the process, it became the final piece in an urban chain linking two major centres, London and Croydon, completing the greatest metropolitan expansion in the world at that time which cost £112 million in today's money.

Geography
The nearest places are Mitcham, Croydon, South Norwood, Norbury, Pollards Hill, Selhurst, Upper Norwood and Eastfields.

The geology for the general area is that some areas have clayey, heavy soil including  Norbury and South Norwood. There is gravelly, fertile soil in parts of the Thornton Heath area which explains why market gardening and gravel extraction were major industries.

Transport

Bus
Thornton Heath is served by London Buses routes 50, 60, 64, 109, 130, 198, 250, 289, 450, 468 and X68, plus night routes N68, N109 and N250 and school route 663. Thornton Heath bus garage, owned by Arriva London, is at the junction of London Road and Thornton Road, known as Thornton Heath Pond.

Rail
Thornton Heath railway station is on the London Victoria branch of the Brighton Main Line, and is operated by Southern. Other stations nearby are Selhurst, the next station down, and Norwood Junction, on the East London line of the London Overground.

Culture and architecture

Architecturally, Thornton Heath is predominantly Victorian in both its residential and commercial sectors. There are a number of imposing, even grand, buildings surviving from this period.

Two examples are St Paul's Church and St Alban's Church.  St Alban's is an  Anglican church and is listed Grade II. Built in 1889, it was the first church designed by the late Victorian architect Sir Ninian Comper. It is situated on a  busy junction (of Grange Road and the High Street), as can be seen in the photograph. It is described as being of a red-brick perpendicular style with stone dressing.

At the junction of the High Street and Parchmore Road, on a site previously called Walker's Green, stands the Clocktower, which was built in 1900, financed partly by public subscription.

However, the  Victorian baths did not survive, and were replaced by a modern sports and leisure centre in 2004. It cost £8m with £2.8m from the British National Lottery Good Causes Fund through Sport England.

Several small and large blocks of flats have been built in the area, in a similar style. A large one is Crystal Court, adjacent to the Leisure Centre. There was an intense fire there. Although the building had passed safety checks, residents were concerned about the role of the cladding. This is being replaced.

Architects have posted about their project in the Library with a Council remit to refurbish and extend the Edwardian building, in particular to improve access. There was also work as part of the regeneration project of the High Street to the Library on Brigstock Road

There was a contest organised by Thornton Heath Community Action team for a planned redesign for the central area, won by architecture students

Demography and economics 
Thornton Heath has a high degree of ethnic diversity with large proportion of people from a BAME background. In the 2011 census, Thornton Heath, comprising the wards of Bensham Manor, Thornton Heath and West Thornton, was Black or Black British (36.4%), White or White British (27.4%), Asian or Asian British (25.9%), Mixed/multiple ethnic groups (7.1%), and  Other ethnic group (6.6%). The largest single ethnicity is White British (20.2%) followed by British African-Caribbean people (17.6%). The average house price from sales in March 2023 was £421,433.

Sport and leisure
Thornton Heath gained a new leisure centre in May 2004 which has proved popular. The popularity was such that turnstiles had to be fitted to improve security. The centre is owned by Croydon Council, but originally run by Parkwood Leisure, and now run by Fusion Lifestyle in partnership with the council.

Thornton Heath formerly had a Non-League football club, Croydon Athletic, who played at the Keith Tuckey Stadium; but the club ceased to exist at the end of the 2010–11 season. In 2012, fans of the club formed AFC Croydon Athletic, which plays at the Mayfield Stadium. In 2015 the club competed in the Southern Counties East League. The reformed 5 time FA Cup winners Wanderers FC currently play at Thornton Heath.

Thornton Heath is also home to historic rugby club Streatham-Croydon RFC founded in 1871. Their grounds and clubhouse are located in Frant Road off Brigstock Road.

Thornton Heath is one of the railway stations used by visitors to Crystal Palace's Selhurst Park stadium.

There are three parks in Thornton Heath. Their websites have details including facilities: Grangewood Park, Thornton Heath Recreation Ground, and Trumble Gardens.

The 2012 Olympic torch was taken along the High Street and Brigstock Road.

Health
Thornton Heath healthcare is part of NHS Croydon Health Services  GP practices are independent and receive NHS funding. The Council covers some health services such as public health. It has sole responsibility for social services.

The local hospital changed its name to Croydon University Hospital. It was assessed in 2021 by the Care Quality Commission as 'requiring improvement' overall. However,some specific services were rated as 'good'.

Community

Thornton Heath Community Action Team was formed in 2014 by a group of residents and businesses. Its aim is to deliver projects and to improve the area. This has included: organising litter picks, planting of new plants, and a community Christmas tree. Members of the community have a garden in part of a local park, and are maintaining the planting area in the Ambassadors House forecourt. They also lobby and campaign on relevant local issues.

Sustainable Thornton Heath is a group of local people concerned about the environment.

Friends of Grangewood Park organise events and projects to improve the park, and to encourage people to use it.

Facebook groups include Thornton Heath Community Action Team and Thornton Heath Local, a more general group. Both are private but easy for local people to join. 
A Thornton Heath app has been created; 'We are Thornton Heath' .

There is local news in the 'Thornton Heath Chronicle'.

There were Thornton Heath festivals for several years up to 2019.

The council had a regeneration plan for Thornton Heath. "Since 2016 we have been involving local people in an improvement programme, making the High Street and Brigstock Road more attractive, with funding from the GLA. This included new pavements and road improvements, upgrades to shop fronts, wall art by local artists along the high street, and improvements to the forecourt of Ambassador House." Unfortunately, there were quality problems with some of the work.

In addition to the murals in the improvement programme, there are other artworks, such as a mosaic and mural at the station. An 'Art Trail' map was compiled as a guide.

All the banks have closed their branches Some (not all) are listed on a website 
There is a growing number of branches from chains such as: Subway, Boots Optician, Poundland and Costa. The number of hairdressers, nail bars, takeaway shops and cafes and independent food shops has increased in recent years. There is also a wider variety of food, such as halal meat and ingredients for some South Asian, Eastern European and Afro Caribbean recipes.

Unfortunately, several food outlets got poor hygiene ratings in an official inspection.

Notable residents

Eric Barker, actor
Alfred J. Bennett, artist
Mary Berkeley, athlete
Martin Butcher, cricketer
Ashley Chin, actor
Del Dettmar, musician
Jane Drew, architect
Mickey Finn, musician
Frankmusik, musician
W. H. Greenleaf, political scientist
D. J. B. Hawkins, philosopher
Beth Hazel, swimmer
Anne Hocking, writer
London Hughes, comedian
Christopher Louis McIntosh Johnson, journalist
Wizz Jones, musician
Simon Jordan, businessman
Peter Ling, television writer
Edward Lloyd, publisher
David Payne, footballer
Dickie Pride, musician
Martyn Rooney, athlete
Flora Sandes, soldier
Steve James Sherlock, composer
John Shuter, cricketer
Paul Simonon, musician
Emile Smith Rowe, footballer
Stormzy, musician
Don Weller, musician
Wilfried Zaha, footballer
SL, rapper

References

External links

 
Districts of the London Borough of Croydon
Areas of London
District centres of London